Stefano Donati (Treviglio, Italy, 27 August 1982) is an Italian sports journalist and TV presenter of Qui studio a voi stadio.

References

1982 births
Italian journalists
Italian male journalists
Living people